James C. Binnicker (July 23, 1938 – March 21, 2015) was a senior enlisted non-commissioned officer in the United States Air Force who served as the 9th Chief Master Sergeant of the Air Force from 1986 to 1990.

Early life
James Binnicker was born on July 23, 1938, in Orangeburg, South Carolina, where he graduated from Aiken High School in 1956.

Military career
Binnicker entered the United States Air Force in August 1957. His first assignment was to the 96th Air Refueling Squadron, Altus Air Force Base, Oklahoma, as a life support specialist. His early years include tours in base and wing operations in Hawaii, North Dakota, Georgia, North Carolina, Vietnam, and Taiwan. He served as the Senior Enlisted Advisor for 12th Air Force, Headquarters Pacific Air Forces, and Headquarters Tactical Air Command. He also represented the Air Force as Senior Enlisted Advisor on the President's Commission on Military Compensation. In February 1985, Binnicker was selected for the 33-year extended tenure program.

Binnicker served as the Chief Master Sergeant of the Air Force from July 1, 1986, to July 1990.

Later life
In March 2000, Binnicker was appointed the president and CEO of the Air Force Enlisted Village (AFEV), a non-profit charity located in Shalimar, Florida, that provides a home for the surviving spouses of enlisted military personnel. Binnicker was a member of the AFEV Board of Directors from 1992 to his death. He died in 2015, aged 76, and is buried at Arlington National Cemetery.

Assignments
August 1957, trainee, United States Air Force Basic Military Training, Lackland Air Force Base, Texas
September 1957 – 1963, life support specialist, 96th Air Refueling Squadron, Altus Air Force Base, Oklahoma
1963 – July 1964, air operations specialist, 816th Strategic Aerospace Division, Altus Air Force Base, Oklahoma
July 1964 – August 1967, noncommissioned officer in charge, wing operations, 1502d Air Transport Wing (later became 61st Military Airlift Wing), Hickam Air Force Base, Hawaii
August 1967 – August 1968, noncommissioned officer in charge, base operations, 4th Strategic Aerospace Division, Grand Forks Air Force Base, North Dakota
August 1968 – September 1969, noncommissioned officer in charge, base operations, 22d Tactical Air Support Training Squadron, Binh Thuy Air Base, Republic of Vietnam; and language instructor, Republic of Vietnam Armed Forces Language School, Ho Chi Minh City, Saigon.
September 1969 – May 1971, air operations superintendent, 58th Military Airlift Squadron, Robins Air Force Base, Georgia.
May 1971 – August 1972, noncommissioned officer in charge, wing operations, 374th Tactical Airlift Wing, Ching Chuan Kang Air Base, Taiwan.
August 1972 – December 1973, operations superintendent, base sergeant major and wing senior enlisted adviser, 4th Tactical Fighter Wing, Seymour Johnson Air Force Base, North Carolina
December 1973 - July 1975 senior enlisted adviser, Ninth Air Force, 9th Air Force, Shaw Air Force Base South Carolina.
July 1975 – June 1978, senior enlisted adviser, Twelfth Air Force, 12th Air Force, Bergstrom Air Force Base, Texas.
June 1978 – Jun 1981, senior enlisted adviser to the commander in chief, Headquarters Pacific Air Forces, Hickam Air Force Base, Hawaii.
June 1981 – May 1982, chief, enlisted retention division, Headquarters Manpower and Personnel Center, Randolph Air Force Base, Texas.
May 1982 – May 1985, assistant for chief master sergeant matters, Headquarters Manpower and Personnel Center, Randolph Air Force Base, Texas.
May 1985 – July 1986, senior enlisted adviser to the commander, Headquarters Tactical Air Command, Langley Air Force Base, Virginia.
July 1986 – July 1990, Chief Master Sergeant of the Air Force, The Pentagon, Washington, D.C.

Awards and decorations

References

1939 births
2015 deaths
United States Air Force personnel of the Vietnam War
Chief Master Sergeants of the United States Air Force
People from Orangeburg, South Carolina
Recipients of the Air Force Distinguished Service Medal
Recipients of the Legion of Merit